The Assizes of Romania, formally the Book of the Usages and Statutes of the Empire of Romania, is a collection of laws compiled in the Principality of Achaea that became the common law code of the states of Frankish Greece in the 13th–15th centuries, and continued in occasional use in the Venetian Ionian Islands until the 18th century.

History 
The compilation comprises a prologue and 219 clauses. The traditional story of the law code's origin, recounted in the prologue, is that the first Latin Emperor, Baldwin I, based it on the Assizes of Jerusalem, but this is disputed. The present collection was actually compiled in the Frankish Morea (the Principality of Achaea) between 1333 and 1346 and is based on a variety of legal traditions. The Assizes of Jerusalem were used in so far as, in the words of medievalist David Jacoby, "[there] the Latins faced political and military circumstances similar to those of the Morea, and existed in a virtual state of perpetual war", but the Moreote collection incorporates also feudal customs imported by the Crusaders directly from Western Europe, legislation from France and Angevin Naples, Byzantine law in matters of inheritance and agricultural law (especially as regards the serfs or paroikoi), as well as laws and court decisions from the Latin Empire and the Principality of Achaea.

Due to the political pre-eminence of Achaea, the Assizes were adopted across most of Frankish Greece, and survived longest in the Venetian colonies in the Ionian Islands, where they were occasionally consulted until the dissolution of the Venetian Republic by Napoleon in 1797. Indeed, the Assizes only survive in Venetian translations dating from 1423 to the mid-18th century.

Editions 
The various manuscripts of the Assizes were first published by Paolo Canciani in 1785:
 

There also exist three critical editions with French, English, and Italian translations respectively:

See also
• Assizes of Jerusalem

References

Sources

External links
 

14th-century documents
14th century in law
Medieval legal codes
Principality of Achaea